An electron is a subatomic particle.

Electron may also refer to:

Science
 Elementary charge or electron
 Electron (bird), a small genus of motmots

Places
 Electron, Gauteng, a community in Gauteng province, South Africa
 Electron, Washington, a community in Washington, US

People
 Electron (computer hacker) or Richard Jones (born 1969), member of an Australian hacking group
 Lou Fine or E Lectron (1914–1971), American comic book artist

Organisations
 Tokyo Electron, an electronics and semiconductor company
 Electron, a tram builder based in Lviv, Ukraine

Other uses
 Electron (comics), a fictional Marvel Comics character
 Rocket Lab Electron, a small orbital rocket in use by Rocket Lab
 Electron (software framework), an open-source framework developed by GitHub
 AMC Electron, a re-branding of AMC Amitron, the electric urban vehicle concept by AMC
 Acorn Electron, an 8-bit computer by Acorn Computers
 BlackBerry Electron, a smartphone by Research in Motion
 Visa Electron, a brand of credit or debit cards
 Electron engine, a video game engine by Obsidian Entertainment
 L-188W "Electron", an Argentine Navy version of the Lockheed L-188 Electra
 Electron Lahar, a mudflow that came from Mount Rainier 500 years ago.

See also
 Elektron (resin), an ancient Greek name for Amber, a fossilized resin
 Elektron (disambiguation)
 Electro (disambiguation)
 Electrum, an alloy of gold and silver
 Tron (disambiguation)